The long-billed bernieria (Bernieria madagascariensis), formerly known as long-billed greenbul and sometimes as common tetraka or long-billed tetraka, is a songbird species endemic to Madagascar. It was initially considered a greenbul, and later with the Old World warblers. Recent research indicates it is part of the endemic Malagasy radiation Bernieridae (Malagasy warblers).

This is at present the only species remaining in the genus Bernieria. Its presumed relatives are not as closely related as was once believed and have been restored to the old genus Xanthomixis.

Its natural habitat is subtropical or tropical moist lowland forests.

Footnotes

References
 Cibois, Alice; Slikas, Beth; Schulenberg, Thomas S. & Pasquet, Eric (2001): An endemic radiation of Malagasy songbirds is revealed by mitochondrial DNA sequence data. Evolution 55(6): 1198–1206. DOI:10.1554/0014-3820(2001)055[1198:AEROMS]2.0.CO;2

Malagasy warblers
Birds described in 1789
Taxa named by Johann Friedrich Gmelin
Taxonomy articles created by Polbot